Art and part is a term used in Scots law to denote the aiding or abetting in the perpetration of a crime, or being an accessory before or at the perpetration of the crime. There is no such offence recognised in Scotland, as that of being an accessory after the fact.

Under section 293 of the Criminal Procedure (Scotland) Act 1995, a person may be convicted of, and punished for, a contravention of any enactment, notwithstanding that he was guilty of such contravention as art and part only.

See also
Legal doublet
Common purpose, a similar principal under English Law

References

Scottish criminal law
Inchoate offenses
Scots law legal terminology